Gnangara Road is an arterial east-west road in Perth, Western Australia. It is located within the northern suburbs of Perth, from Madeley in the west, to Henley Brook in the east. Gnangara Road provides a connection between Great Northern Highway (via West Swan Road) and Wanneroo Road. The construction of the Ocean Reef Road extension in 2011 altered the road network in the Landsdale area in Landsdale. The plans show Gnangara Road as discontinuous between Mirrabooka Avenue and Alexander Drive, with the Mirrabooka Avenue and Ocean Reef Road extensions linking the two sections. Following construction, those linking road sections were named as Gnangara Road, allowing the road to remain continuous.

Route description

From its western terminus at Wanneroo Road, Gnangara Road travels along the southern boundary of the Wangara industrial area. It continues east to reach Mirrabooka Avenue after 3.7 km (2.3 mi), where it then travels northwards for 350 m (1,150 ft) to Ocean Reef Road, before turning right to continue east for 1.5 km (0.9 mi) to Alexander Drive, and then after another 5 km (3.1 mi) it encounters Tonkin Highway at a parclo interchange. The road travels past Whiteman Park's northern edge, and the southern edge of Ellenbrook. It finally terminates, after  journey, in Henley Brook at West Swan Road, which connects northwards to Great Northern Highway, and southwards to Reid Highway.

History

Traffic lights were installed in 2007 at the then-recently duplicated Alexander Drive intersection.

In 2011, as part of the Ocean Reef Road extension, the section between Mirrabooka Avenue/Sydney Road/Ocean Reef Road intersection and West Swan Road had the State Route 83 allocation replaced by State Route 84. The road is discontinuous at Wangara, where motorists will have to travel northwards along Mirrabooka Avenue to turn right at the nearby intersection to continue on Gnangara Road.

Gnangara Road was upgraded to a four lane dual carriage way between Drumpellier Drive and Pinaster Parade, near Ellenbrook. The works began in May 2012, and included traffic lights at the intersection of Gnangara Road and Drumpellier Drive, drainage, and kerbing. The upgrade works were completed on schedule, in December 2012, at a cost of more the $3.3 million.

Also in 2012 a single lane roundabout was  constructed at Gnangara Road's eastern terminus with West Swan Road and Henry Street. Construction works began after the relocation of water and electrical services, and took 12 to 15 months.

The state government committed $6.6 million to construct a second carriageway between Beechboro Road North and Drumpellier Drive, and an additional $14 million to complete the remaining  up to Alexander Drive which took place between 2013 and 2015. The works involved installing traffic lights at the intersection with Beechboro Road North, which was the site of 131 accidents during the five-year period to 2010, and rated fifth in the RAC’s 2012 list of Western Australia’s worst intersections. In 2019, the intersection was subsequently removed as part of the NorthLink WA project due both to the new parclo interchange with Tonkin Highway opening just to the east along with the carriageway itself crossing the path of Beechboro Road North (that road was made a cul-de-sac at its northern end accessible from near Hepburn Avenue).

Future Works
Gnangara Road in the City of Swan is planned to ultimately be upgraded to a six lane dual carriageway road between Alexander Drive and Tonkin Highway, and a four lane dual carriage road between Tonkin Highway and Pinaster Parade.

The City of Swan also has plans for a shared pedestrian–cyclist path (Principal Shared Path) alongside Gnangara Road from Pinaster Parade to Tonkin Highway. The estimated cost is $2.96 million.

Major intersections

  Wanneroo Road (State Route 60 / State Route 83 north), Madeley - to 
 Hartman Drive, Wangara, Madeley, and Darch
 Prestige Parade north / Attwell Street south, Wangara and Landsdale
 Mirrabooka Avenue south, Wangara and Landsdale
  Ocean Reef Road (State Route 84) west / Sydney Road north, Gnangara and Landsdale
  Alexander Drive (State Route 56), Gnangara and Landsdale
  Tonkin Highway (State Route 4), Cullacabardee, Lexia, and Whiteman - (replaced  Beechboro Road North (State Route 53) in 2019)
 Drumpellier Drive, Ellenbrook, Whiteman, and Henley Brook
 Starflower Road south / Pinaster Parade north, Ellenbrook, Whiteman, and Henley Brook
 Henley Brook Avenue, Ellenbrook and Henley Brook
  West Swan Road (State Route 52) north and south / Henry Street east, Henley Brook

See also

References

Roads in Perth, Western Australia
Articles containing video clips